The 2008 Utah Republican presidential primary took place on February 5, 2008, with 36 national delegates. Polls showed Mitt Romney leading at up to 85% of the vote.

On August 23, 2008 the Utah Republican party adopted a standing rule effectively binding the delegates to John McCain for the first ballot at the National Convention (as Romney had withdrawn).

Results

See also
 2008 Republican Party presidential primaries
 2008 Utah Democratic presidential primary

References

Utah
2008 Utah elections
2008 Super Tuesday
Utah Republican primaries